The Tel Aviv Savidor Central railway station (Tel Aviv Savidor Merkaz) is a major railway station on the Ayalon Railway in central Tel Aviv, Israel, serving most lines of Israel Railways.

It is located in the median of the Ayalon Highway at the Arlozorov interchange, with bridges over the highway linking passengers to a large Tel Aviv bus terminal to the west and the Ramat Gan Diamond Exchange District to the east. In 2019, over 13 million passengers used the station, making it the second-busiest in the country after HaShalom station one stop to the south.

The station was opened to the public in November 1954 under the name Tel Aviv Central, and throughout its history was also widely known as Arlozorov station. It was eventually named after Menachem Savidor, Israel Railways' chairman between 1954–1964 and later the Speaker of the Knesset.

It has three island platforms serving a total of six tracks, the most recent of which were built in 2005. An additional island platform and two more tracks are expected to be added to the station in the mid-2020s as part of the project to expand the capacity of the Ayalon Railway. Electrification works in the station were completed in 2020. 

In 2018 a northern access terminal fronting Modai'i bridge opened, adding a third passenger entry and exit point out of the station and facilitating additional access to the Diamond Exchange District. An underground station of the future Red Line light rail is being built at the site, to be opened by late 2022.

History

The railway station was originally the southern terminus of the Coastal railway line, which opened on November 3, 1954 and reached what was then the northern fringe of Tel Aviv. For the next four decades, it only handled trains to and from the north, and was colloquially known as Tel Aviv North station. This colloquial name could be ambiguous because between 1949 and Tel Aviv central's opening in 1954, "Tel Aviv North" was the official name of the Bnei Brak railway station. Railway service to and from destinations south of Tel Aviv was provided from Tel Aviv South railway station, which was not connected to Tel Aviv Central.

In its initial configuration as a terminal station, the passenger platforms were located directly north of the terminal building, to the west of their present location. In 1988, the tracks leading to the station (along the present Pinchas Sapir Street) were shifted eastwards as works on the Ayalon Highway and railway progressed southwards. The station's platforms were then moved to their current location and a pedestrian bridge over the Ayalon Highway was built to connect them to the terminal building to the west. The station with its relocated tracks was opened to the public on January 10, 1988, and the official opening took place on May 3 of the same year. In 1993 the station ceased being a terminal station when the Ayalon section of the coastal railway was extended to link with the Jaffa–Jerusalem railway in southern Tel Aviv. At that point, the little-used Tel Aviv South station (which unlike Tel Aviv Central was not located on the Ayalon line) was closed for passengers and services operating to it were routed to the more conveniently located Tel Aviv Central station instead. Between the closing of Tel Aviv South and the opening of Tel Aviv HaShalom in 1996, Tel Aviv Central was the only active passenger railway station in the city.

Until 1980 the head office of Israel Railways was located at Haifa Central station when Tzvi Tzafriry, the general manager of Israel Railways decided to move the head office to Tel Aviv Central. In 2017 Israel Railways' head office was relocated from Tel Aviv Central to a new office complex situated on the grounds of the Lod railway station, with the new station terminal being later built directly to its south.

Central bus terminal

The central bus terminal (מסוף רכבת מרכז), Arlozorov Terminal or Tel Aviv 2000 Terminal (מסוף 2000) is a major bus station located next to the Tel Aviv Central railway station, near the border of Tel Aviv and Ramat Gan, next to the Ayalon Highway and the junction of several traffic arteries: Jabotinsky Road that leads to Ramat Gan, Bnei Brak and Petah Tikva, Begin Road that goes to south Tel Aviv, Namir Road to north Tel Aviv and further to Highway 2 and Arlozorov street westward to the sea. Arlozorov/2000 Terminal should not be confused however with the Tel Aviv Central Bus Station, located in southern Tel Aviv – nearby the HaHagana railway station. 

Together, the bus and train terminals at the site constitute a major transportation hub that plays a significant role in both short- and long-distance public transportation in Israel. As of 2016 the bus terminal serves about 120,000 passengers daily.

Buses of Egged, Dan, Kavim, Metropoline, Afikim, Superbus and Nateev Express bus companies stop at the terminal and surrounding streets.

The terminal lies in the open air, unlike the central bus stations in Tel Aviv, Jerusalem and some other cities, which are inside large buildings that also double as shopping malls. The open-air terminal underwent renovations in 2018-2019.

Train service

Station layout
Platform numbers increase in a West-to-East direction

Ridership

References

External links

Tel Aviv Savidor Central at the Israel Railways website
Transport Today and Tomorrow

Railway stations in Tel Aviv
Railway stations opened in 1954